Gail M. Reals (born September 1, 1935, Syracuse, New York) is an American former military officer. She was a brigadier general in the United States Marine Corps.

Career 

She was commissioned a second lieutenant in 1961. She was commanding officer of Woman Recruit Training Battalion. In 1985, she was commissioned brigadier general. She was commanding general of Marine Corps Base Quantico. In 1990, she retired from the Marine Corps.

Awards and honors 
Gail Reals was  awarded the Legion of Merit. She was named a notable woman of Arlington.

References 

Created via preloaddraft
1935 births
Living people
Female generals of the United States Marine Corps